Adrian Damian Marek (born 12 October 1987) is a Polish former professional footballer who played as a defender.

Career

Club
In February 2011, he was loaned to Odra Wodzisław.

International
He represented Poland at the 2007 FIFA U-20 World Cup.

References

External links
 

Living people
1987 births
Polish footballers
People from Dąbrowa Górnicza
Sportspeople from Silesian Voivodeship
Association football defenders
Poland youth international footballers
Poland under-21 international footballers
Zagłębie Sosnowiec players
Odra Wodzisław Śląski players
Ekstraklasa players
I liga players
II liga players